Zahrib is a small settlement in the hills northeast of the town of Cerknica in the Inner Carniola region of Slovenia.

References

External links

Zahrib on Geopedia

Populated places in the Municipality of Cerknica